is a professional Japanese baseball player. He is a pitcher for the Fukuoka SoftBank Hawks of Nippon Professional Baseball (NPB). He previously played in NPB for the Hiroshima Toyo Carp.

Professional career

Hiroshima Toyo Carp

On October 23, 2014, Fujii was drafted  by the Hiroshima Toyo Carp in the 2014 Nippon Professional Baseball draft.

2015–2020 season
In 2015–2016 season, Fujii played in the Western League of NPB's second league.

On September 30, 2017, Fujii debuted in the Central League against the Yokohama DeNA BayStars as a relief pitcher, and recorded Holds. In 2017 season, he pitched in two games in the Central League.

On June 6, 2018, he pitched against the Hokkaido Nippon-Ham Fighters in an Interleague play (NPB) and recorded his first win. In 2018 season, he finished the regular season with 8 Games pitched, a 1–0 Win–loss record, a 6.14 ERA, and a 21 strikeouts in 14.2 innings. In 2018 season, he finished the regular season with 8 Games pitched, a 1–0 Win–loss record, a 6.14 ERA, and a 21 strikeouts in 14.2 innings.

In 2019 season, he pitched in 4 games in the Central League.

In 2020 season, he never got a chance to pitch in the first league. On November 4, 2020, the Carp announced he would be released.

Kochi Fighting Dogs
On December 29, 2020, Fujii signed with the Kochi Fighting Dogs of the independent league Shikoku Island League Plus.

On May 9, 2021, he achieved a no-hitter in an interleague match against the Fukuoka SoftBank Hawks 3rd squad. This later became the notch for the Hawks to acquire Fujii.

In 2021 season, he finished the regular season with 22 Games pitched, a 11–3 Win–loss record, a 1.12 ERA, and a 180 strikeouts in 145 innings.

Fukuoka SoftBank Hawks
On December 14, 2021, Fujii signed with the Fukuoka SoftBank Hawks a 5.5 million yen contract as a developmental player.

On March 22, 2022, he re-signed a 6.5 million yen contract as a registered player under control. He pitched as a relief pitcher in the match against the Hokkaido Nippon-Ham Fighters on March 27, and won the NPB for the first time in four years.  On June 1, he recorded his first Save against the Yomiuri Giants in an Interleague play (NPB). Since then, he has contributed to the team as a Setup man, finished the regular season with 55 Games pitched, a 5–1 Win–loss record, a 1.12 ERA, a 22 Holds, a 3 Saves, and a 81 strikeouts in 56.1 innings.

References

External links

 Career statistics - NPB.jp
 48 Kouya Fujii PLAYERS2022 - Fukuoka SoftBank Hawks Official site

1996 births
Living people
Nippon Professional Baseball pitchers
Baseball people from Okayama Prefecture
Fukuoka SoftBank Hawks players
Hiroshima Toyo Carp players